Konstantinos Kotsaridis (born 12 June 1992) is a Greek professional footballer who plays as a defensive midfielder and a left back, he is currently a free agent.

Career

Kotsaridis started his career το the youth teams of Olympiacos in 2006 becoming captain of the U20 team but failing to appear in the first team although he was a regular member of Greece's U17 and U19 and U21 national teams with 48 caps and 2 goals. He was signed as a free agent by AEK in 2012 and later in January 2013 by Aris Thessaloniki.

References

External links
 

1992 births
Living people
Greek footballers
Greece youth international footballers
Greece under-21 international footballers
AEK Athens F.C. players
Aris Thessaloniki F.C. players
Niki Volos F.C. players
Super League Greece players
Greek expatriate footballers
Expatriate footballers in Belgium
Olympiacos F.C. players
Association football midfielders
Panelefsiniakos F.C. players
Association football fullbacks
Footballers from Thessaloniki
K.R.C. Gent players